The Complexo Cultural da República (Portuguese for "Cultural Complex of the Republic") is a cultural center located along the Eixo Monumental, in the city of Brasília, Brazil. It is formed by the National Library of Brasília and the National Museum of the Republic. Both buildings were designed by Pritzker Prize-winning Brazilian architect Oscar Niemeyer and inaugurated in 2006.

National Library

National Museum of the Republic
The National Museum of the Republic ("Museu Nacional Honestino Guimarães" in Portuguese), consists of a  exhibit area, two 780-seat auditoriums, and a laboratory. The space is covered with a dome with ramps leading to the entrance. The building is mainly used to display temporary art exhibits.

Gallery

See also
 National Historical Museum of Brazil (Rio de Janeiro)
 National Library of Brazil (Rio de Janeiro)
 National Museum of Brazil (Rio de Janeiro)
 List of Oscar Niemeyer works

References

External links

Buildings and structures in Brasília
Oscar Niemeyer buildings
Tourist attractions in Brasília
Museums in Brasília